Siphonaria hispida is a species of air-breathing sea snail or false limpet, a marine pulmonate gastropod mollusc in the family Siphonariidae, the false limpets.

Description

Distribution

References

Siphonariidae
Gastropods described in 1846